Brooke Maree McClymont (born 16 May 1981) is an Australian singer, songwriter and guitarist. With her two younger sisters, Samantha and Mollie, she is a founder of a country music trio, the McClymonts. She has written songs for Kate DeAraugo and Olivia Newton-John and been a support act for Troy Cassar-Daley and Ronan Keating. Her influences include Sheryl Crow, ABBA, Faith Hill and Alanis Morissette.

Biography 

McClymont was discovered in 1992, at age eleven, when a family friend heard her sing in front of the mirror at her home and told Brooke's mother that she should put her into the Jacaranda Talent Quest in Grafton. Her mother entered her into the contest and she sang "All I Wanna Do Is Make Love to You" by Heart. In 1999, she sang "God Save the Queen" and "Advance Australia Fair" to open the day-night Australia vs. England cricket match.

Charles Fisher was one of the people McClymont worked with on her debut album and she stated that the two had a really good working relationship. "I Can't Wait" was chosen to be the first song released because McClymont felt it is a really positive song and definitely shows her personality. The song was released as a CD on 17 June 2002 and peaked in the top fifty at number forty-nine. Soon after, the song was again recorded by Hilary Duff for the Disney Channel original series Lizzie McGuire. "I Don't Think, I Know" was the second song released on 2 December 2002 and it also peaked in the top fifty at number forty-five. McClymont stated that she did not get to release her album as certain circumstances arose, it just never happened.

In 2006, McClymont and her two sisters (Samantha and Mollie) started a band named The McClymonts. By 2019 the band had amassed one platinum and two gold records, two ARIA Awards, one APRA Award and thirteen Country Music Awards of Australia ("Golden Guitars").

in 2016 McClymont appeared in her first movie, an Australian romantic comedy Spin Out.

McClymont is married to singer-songwriter Adam Eckersley. They had a daughter in 2013 and a son in 2020.

The duo released the album Adam & Brooke in February 2018 which peaked at number 16 on the ARIA Charts.

In January 2022, McClymont appeared as a contestant on the eighth season of I’m A Celebrity…Get Me Out Of Here! Australia. She finished second, behind winner Dylan Lewis.

Discography

Albums

Singles

Awards and nominations

ARIA Music Awards
The ARIA Music Awards are a set of annual ceremonies presented by Australian Recording Industry Association (ARIA), which recognise excellence, innovation, and achievement across all genres of the music of Australia. They commenced in 1987.

! 
|-
| 2018 || Adam & Brooke (with Adam Eckersley) || ARIA Award for Best Country Album ||  ||

Country Music Awards of Australia
The Country Music Awards of Australia is an annual awards night held in January during the Tamworth Country Music Festival. Celebrating recording excellence in the Australian country music industry. They commenced in 1973.
 

! 
|-
|rowspan="4"| 2019 ||rowspan="2"|  || Song of the Year||  ||rowspan="4"| 
|-
| Single of the Year ||   
|-
| Adam & Brooke  ||  Group or Duo of the Year ||   
|-
| Adam & Brooke (with Adam Eckersley) || Contemporary Country Album of the Year ||   
|-
|rowspan="4"| 2023 || "Memory Lane" (with Adam Eckersley) || Single of the Year ||  ||rowspan="4"| 
|-
| "Star of the Show" (with Adam Eckersley) (Directed by Brad Murnane) || Video of the Year || 
|-
| "Star of the Show" (with Adam Eckersley) || Song of the Year || 
|-
| Brooke McClymont & Adam Eckersley || Group or Duo of the Year ||

References

1981 births
Australian women singer-songwriters
Living people
People from Grafton, New South Wales
21st-century Australian singers
21st-century Australian women singers
Singers from New South Wales
I'm a Celebrity...Get Me Out of Here! (Australian TV series) participants